Kelai may refer to:

Kelai River, river in Borneo
Kalayeh, Rudbar, Iranian village
John Kelai (born 1976), Kenyan long-distance runner
Punan Kelai language, Indonesia language